Trichocentrum luridum is a species of orchid found from Mexico, Belize, Central America to northern South America.

References

External links 

luridum
Orchids of Central America
Orchids of Belize
Orchids of Mexico
Orchids of South America